The 1911 Middleton by-election was a parliamentary by-election held on 2 August 1911 for the Middleton division of Lancashire, a constituency of the British House of Commons.

Vacancy
Ryland Adkins had been Liberal MP for Middleton since 1906 when he gained the seat from the Conservatives. Upon his appointment as Recorder of Nottingham on 17 July 1911, Adkins was obliged by the electoral law of the day to resign his seat and re-contest it at a by-election.

Electoral history

Candidates
Adkins Unionist opponent was William Hewins who was his opponent at the December 1910 general election.

Campaign
The by-election was fought mainly on the issue of National Insurance which Hewins took up vigorously, if by some accounts rather cynically. In the course of the campaign Lloyd George had to send Adkins a letter for public consumption refuting in detail Hewins’ claims.

Result
Adkins held on, although Hewins reduced his majority again, this time to 411 votes.

Aftermath
Hewins was elected in a by-election at Hereford in 1912.
A General Election was due to take place by the end of 1915. By the autumn of 1914, the following candidates had been adopted to contest that election. 

Due to the outbreak of war, the election never took place. In 1918, following boundary changes, the Middleton constituency was combined with Prestwich.

Adkins was the endorsed candidate of the Coalition Government.

References

1911 elections in the United Kingdom
1911 in England
1910s in Lancashire
Elections in the Metropolitan Borough of Rochdale
By-elections to the Parliament of the United Kingdom in Lancashire constituencies
By-elections to the Parliament of the United Kingdom in Greater Manchester constituencies